Fieffes-Montrelet is a commune in the Somme department in Hauts-de-France in northern France.

Geography

History
In 1975, the two communes of Fieffes and Montrelet were united to create a single administrative entity.

Population

Places of interest
Fieffes church
The church of Saint-Pierre is in the Romanesque style.
The altar has recently (2007) been restored at a cost of €7500
Montrelet church
Surrounded by the graveyard, it is unusually aligned with the river and in a high position.

See also
Communes of the Somme department

References

External links

 Fieffes-Montrelet, by Alain Molès and Michel Somon 

Communes of Somme (department)